Uwe Alzen (born 18 August 1967) is a German racing driver specialised in touring car racing and sports car racing.

Biography
He won the 1992 Porsche Carrera Cup Deutschland, the 1994 Porsche Supercup and the 1995  Deutsche Tourenwagen Meisterschaft privateer B-Class championship.

In 1996 he raced in the full Deutsche Tourenwagen Meisterschaft International Touring Car Championship, driving an Opel Calibra V6. When this series was discontinued, he raced for Opel in the German Super Tourenwagen Cup. Alzen celebrated an apparent championship win in 1999 for Opel under controversial circumstances after a last corner incident involving his teammate Roland Asch and his main rival for the championship Christian Abt. Alzen, who was leading the race at the time, barely limped to 2nd place after crashing with Abt's teammate Kris Nissen, whom he was trying to lap seconds earlier at the chicane. Weeks later though, his Championship win was stripped and was given to his rival, Christian Abt, after an amateur video proved that Asch had deliberately crashed into Abt.

Alzen continued with Opel in 2000 in the new Deutsche Tourenwagen Masters, but was released after colliding with his teammate Manuel Reuter. He left the AMG-Mercedes team in 2003 under similar circumstances.

Alzen won the GT1 category of the 1998 24 Hours of Daytona in a Rohr Motorsport Porsche 911 GT1 Evo.

Alzen was also a competitor in the 1998 FIA GT Championship season and 1998 24 Hours of Le Mans race in a Porsche 911 GT1, finishing 2nd overall. In 2004 he also competed in FIA GT, with Michael Bartels on a Vitaphone-sponsored Saleen S7.

Uwe Alzen and his elder brother Jürgen Alzen were also driving at the Nürburgring Nordschleife VLN Endurance racing series and 24 Hours Nürburgring in their privately built Porsche 996 GT2 Turbo 4WD from 2003 to 2005. Uwe Alzen set the lap record there with this Turbo at 8:09, about 10 seconds faster than the factory cars of Opel and Audi from the DTM, as well as the BMW M3 V8 GTR of Schnitzer Motorsport. He also has beaten them for the pole positions, yet his car failed at the start of the 2005 wet race due to electronic problems, prompting another very emotional interview.

Nürburgring-Fans voted him Driver of the Year 2004.

Due to rule changes for 2006, also the Alzen brothers discontinued their use of a turbo engine in favor of a normally aspirated Porsche 997 GT3. But they chose to run a standard H pattern manual gearbox in the 2006 24h race, convinced that the Porsche sequential gearbox would not last. They finished in second place, after the Manthey Porsche which has a sequential gearbox that saves several seconds per lap. Uwe was quite upset with the disadvantages of having a manual gearbox during the post race press conference.

In 2008 Uwe Alzen entered the Speedcar International Series, racing for Phoenix Racing, winning two races and finishing third overall.

In January 2012 Alzen is confirmed for a full season driving a BMW in the American Le Mans Series sharing a car with Jörg Müller.

Racing record

Complete 24 Hours of Le Mans results

Complete Deutsche Tourenwagen Meisterschaft/Masters results
(key) (Races in bold indicate pole position) (Races in italics indicate fastest lap)

Complete International Touring Car Championship results
(key) (Races in bold indicate pole position) (Races in italics indicate fastest lap)

Partial Porsche Supercup results
(key) (Races in bold indicate pole position) (Races in italics indicate fastest lap)

† — Did not finish the race, but was classified as he completed over 90% of the race distance.

‡ — Not eligible for points.

References

External links
 Uwe Alzen
 Jürgen Alzen Motorsport
 Nürburgring Fan Site

1967 births
Living people
People from Kirchen
Racing drivers from Rhineland-Palatinate
German racing drivers
FIA GT Championship drivers
Deutsche Tourenwagen Masters drivers
24 Hours of Le Mans drivers
Speedcar Series drivers
American Le Mans Series drivers
European Le Mans Series drivers
Porsche Supercup drivers
Blancpain Endurance Series drivers
ADAC GT Masters drivers
24 Hours of Spa drivers
HWA Team drivers
Porsche Motorsports drivers
BMW M drivers
Mercedes-AMG Motorsport drivers
Rahal Letterman Lanigan Racing drivers
Phoenix Racing drivers
Schnitzer Motorsport drivers
Nürburgring 24 Hours drivers
Porsche Carrera Cup Germany drivers